Charles Victoire Emmanuel Leclerc (17 March 1772 – 2 November 1802) was a French Army general who served under Napoleon Bonaparte during the French Revolution. He was husband to Pauline Bonaparte, sister to Napoleon. In 1801, he was sent to Saint-Domingue (Haiti), where an expeditionary force under his command captured and deported the Haitian leader Toussaint Louverture, as part of an unsuccessful attempt to reassert imperial control over the Saint-Domingue government. Leclerc died of yellow fever during the failed expedition.

Biography

To 1801
Leclerc started his military career in 1791 during the French Revolution as one of the army volunteers of Seine-et-Oise and passed through the ranks of sous-lieutenant in the 12th Cavalry, then aide-de-camp to general Lapoype. He was made a captain and divisional chief of staff during the siege of Toulon, at which he first allied himself to Napoleon Bonaparte. Following the revolutionary success there, he campaigned along the Rhine. He began serving under Napoleon Bonaparte in the Alpine and Italian campaigns, fighting at Castiglione della Pescaia and Rivoli and rising to général de brigade in 1797. He was then charged with announcing to the French Directory the signature of the peace preliminaries at Leoben. Pauline Bonaparte was at this time receiving a large number of suitors, thus pressing her brother Napoleon Bonaparte to have her married off. On Leclerc's return, he accepted Bonaparte's offer of Pauline's hand in marriage and they married in 1797, having one child, Dermide, and occupying the Château de Montgobert.

He became chef d'état-major to generals Berthier and Brune and served in the second unsuccessful French Army military expedition to Ireland led by Jean Joseph Amable Humbert in 1798. On Bonaparte's return from the Egyptian expedition in 1798, he made Leclerc a général de division and sent him to the armée du Rhin under Moreau. At this rank Leclerc was able to participate in the coup d'etat of 18 Brumaire (in November 1799) that made his brother-in-law Napoleon First Consul of France – supported by Murat, he ordered the grenadiers to march into the room of the Council of Five Hundred. He was next noted for his participation in the Rhine campaign and the Battle of Hohenlinden, receiving the supreme command of the 17th, 18th, and 19th military divisions. He then passed from that post to being commander-in-chief of an army corps that Napoleon meant to send to Portugal to force it to renounce its alliance with England, though that expedition never took place.

Saint-Domingue

In 1791, black slaves in the Caribbean colony of Saint-Domingue had risen up against their French owners in the Haitian Revolution, which was contemporaneous with the French Revolution. In August 1793, the French Republican commissioner Léger-Félicité Sonthonax officially abolished slavery on Saint-Domingue, as part of an effort to recruit rebel slaves to the side of the new French Republic. The prominent rebel leader Toussaint Louverture, himself a former slave, joined the French Republican side shortly afterwards. By 1801, Louverture had consolidated his rule over the entire island of Hispaniola, including the colony of Saint-Domingue. In July 1801, Louverture promulgated a new constitution for the colony that appointed himself governor for life, while simultaneously reaffirming the colony's position as "part of the French empire."

Upon receiving the news in October 1801, Napoleon interpreted Louverture's new constitution as an unacceptable offense to French imperial authority, and subsequently appointed Leclerc commander of a military expedition to reconquer Saint-Domingue. In his initial instructions, Bonaparte directed Leclerc to disarm Louverture's black-controlled government and deport his military officers to France, while publicly maintaining the abolition of slavery in Saint-Domingue. Bonaparte announced intentions to reinstate slavery in neighboring Spanish Santo Domingo, which Louverture had recently occupied. It was Napoleon's intention to reinstate slavery in Saint-Domingue once Louverture had been arrested.

Leclerc set off from Brest in December 1801 and landed at Cap-Français in February 1802, with other warships and a total of 40,000 troops (including reinforcements, upwards to 80,000 troops were sent to Saint-Domingue during Leclerc's campaign), publicly repeating Bonaparte's promise that "all of the people of Saint-Domingue are French" and forever free. Louverture's harsh discipline had made him numerous enemies and Leclerc played off the ambitions of Louverture's younger key officers and competitors against each other, promising that they would maintain their ranks in the French Army and thus bringing them to abandon Louverture. The French won several victories and regained control in three months after severe fighting, with Louverture forced to negotiate an honorable surrender and to retire to tend his plantations under house arrest. However, Napoleon had given secret instructions to Leclerc to arrest Louverture, and so Leclerc seized Louverture – during a meeting – for deportation to France, where he died while imprisoned at Fort de Joux in the Jura Mountains in 1803.

Despite his superiors' warnings, Leclerc did not consolidate his victory by disarming Louverture's old officers. After a brief period in which he incorporated many of Louverture's officers into his own forces, Leclerc began suffering mass defections of troops over the latter half of 1802. Those troops, along with the black and Creole population of the colony, rose up in response to news that slavery had been reestablished on Guadeloupe. The prospect of a similar restoration on Saint-Domingue swung the tide inexorably against French hopes for reimposing control, as Leclerc began executing suspected conspirators en masse.

By October 1802, Leclerc wrote to Bonaparte advocating for a war of extermination, declaring that "We must destroy all the blacks of the mountains – men and women – and spare only children under 12 years of age. We must destroy half of those in the plains and must not leave a single colored person in the colony who has worn an epaulette." In that letter to Bonaparte, Leclerc also lamented his assignment, declaring "My soul is withered, and no joyful thought can ever make forget these hideous scenes." In the meantime, more black and mulatto army officers had defected, including Jean Jacques Dessalines, Alexandre Pétion and Henri Christophe. After Christophe massacred several hundred Polish soldiers at Port-de-Paix following his defection, Leclerc ordered the arrest of all remaining black colonial troops in Le Cap, and executed 1,000 of them by tying sacks of flour to their neck and pushing them off the side of ships.

Death 
In November 1802, Leclerc died of yellow fever, which had already decimated his invasion force. His wife Pauline returned to Europe, where she later married the Italian nobleman Camillo Borghese. Leclerc was succeeded in command by General Rochambeau, whose brutal racial warfare drove more leaders back to the rebel armies. On 18 November 1803, François Capois defeated Rochambeau's forces in the Battle of Vertières. Dessalines proclaimed the independence of Haïti and its new name on 1 January 1804. In the meantime Leclerc's body had been transported to France by his widow and buried on one of his estates.

Memorials

A statue at Pontoise shows him in Napoleonic uniform, his scabbard touching the earth. It was put up by marshal Davout and his second wife Louise-Aimée-Julie (Leclerc's sister) at the top of a staircase built in 1869 by François Lemot. Around 3m high, the statue is on a square stone pedestal inscribed with information on him in gold majuscule letters. It adjoins the south side of city's cathedral. There is also a statue of him by Jean Guillaume Moitte in the Pantheon de Paris.

References

Bibliography
Girard, Philippe R. "Liberte, Egalite, Esclavage : French Revolutionary Ideals and the Failure of the Leclerc Expedition to Saint-Domingue," French Colonial History, Volume 6, 2005, pp. 55–77

External links

 Bob Corbett's Haiti Page – Online collection of resources on the revolution in Haiti. See especially links to the Haiti Mailing List and Corbett's essays on the revolutionary period.

French generals
Names inscribed under the Arc de Triomphe
1772 births
1802 deaths
French Republican military leaders of the French Revolutionary Wars
People of the Haitian Revolution
People from Pontoise
Deaths from yellow fever
Infectious disease deaths in Haiti
Governors of Saint-Domingue
1800s in Guadeloupe
18th-century French military personnel